Arthur John Capes (23 February 1875 – 26 February 1945) was an English footballer who played in the Football League for Bristol City, Burton Wanderers, Nottingham Forest and Stoke.

Capes played with his brother Adrian at Burton Wanderers before joining Nottingham Forest in 1896. He won the 1898 FA Cup with Forest and scored 42 goals for the club in 197 games. He spent two seasons at Stoke scoring 20 goals in 65 matches and ended his career with Bristol City and Swindon Town. He earned one cap for England in 1903 whilst with Stoke.

Career
Capes was born in Burton upon Trent and began his career at Burton Wanderers along with his brother Adrian. He and his brother formed a formidable partnership and in two seasons with Burton the pair scored 66 goals between them. This brought the attention of bigger clubs and they both signed for Nottingham Forest in August 1896. Adrian failed to make a lasting impression at Forest leaving after two seasons, but Arthur did scoring in the 1898 FA Cup Final as Forest beat archrivals Derby County 3–1.

Capes became a vital part of the Forest squad and spent six seasons at the City Ground making 197 appearances scoring 42 goals. He left for Stoke in 1902 becoming the second member of Nottingham's cup winning team to join the "Potters" following Len Benbow. Unlike Benbow, Capes lived up to the expectations of the Stoke fans scoring nine goals in 1902–03 and eleven in 1903–04. After his two-season spell at the Victoria Ground Capes spent a season each at Bristol City and then Swindon Town.

Career statistics

Club
Source:

International
Source:

Honours
 Nottingham Forest
 FA Cup winner: 1898

References

External links
 
 Swindon Town profile
 England profile

1875 births
1945 deaths
Sportspeople from Burton upon Trent
English footballers
England international footballers
Burton Wanderers F.C. players
Nottingham Forest F.C. players
Bristol City F.C. players
Swindon Town F.C. players
Stoke City F.C. players
English Football League players
English Football League representative players
Association football inside forwards
FA Cup Final players